Istros books is a London-based independent publisher of writers from South-East Europe and the Balkans, in English translation. It was set up in 2011 by Susan Curtis.

Publications
Notable publications include:

Doppelgänger by Daša Drndić (Croatia), translated by Celia Hawkesworth & S.D. Curtis, 2018.
Seven Terrors by Selvedin Avdić (Bosnia), translated by Coral Petkovich
Shortlisted for the Republic of Consciousness Prize (2019):

Diary of a Short-Sighted Adolescent (2016) and Gaudeamus (2018) by Mircea Eliade (Romania), translated by Christopher Moncrieff and Christopher Bartholomew.
Exile by Çiler İlhan (Turkey), translated by Aysegul Tososer Artes, winner of  the European Prize for Literature, 2011.
The Son by Andrej Nikolaidis (Montenegro), translated by Will Firth, 2013. The original work was a winner of the European Prize for Literature, 2011.
Life Begins on Friday by Ioana Pârvulescu (Romania), translated by Alistair Ian Blythe, with an afterword by Mircea Cărtărescu, winner of the European Prize for Literature, 2013.
Quiet Flows the Una by Faruk Šehić (Bosnia and Herzegovina), 2016. The original work was a winner of the European Prize for Literature, 2013.
Fairground Magician by Jelena Lengold (Serbia), translated by Celia Hawkesworth, 2013. The original work was a winner of the European Prize for Literature, 2011.

Other authors
Other authors that Istros Books have published include: Dušan Šarotar, Robert Perišić, Julio Llamazares, Aleš Šteger, Ognjen Spahić, Goran Vojnović, Srećko Horvat, Slavoj Žižek, Alek Popov, Marija Knežević, Octavian Paler, Ayfer Tunç, Evald Flisar and Marinko Koščec.

References

External links 

 Official website

Book publishing companies of the United Kingdom
Publishing companies based in London